The Battle of Al-Qarn was a military engagement between the Umayyad governor of ifriqya Handhala ibn Safwan al-Kalbi and the Sufrite Berber insurgents led by Oqasha ibn Ayub al-Fezari, the Umayyads were victorious in the bloody battle but withdrew after suffering heavy casualties.

Battle

the Umayyad armies in the Battle of the Nobles and Battle of Bagdoura were decisively crushed, hearing this, the Umayyad Caliph Hisham ibn Abd al-Malik appointed Handhala ibn Safwan al-Kalbi as the new governor of ifiriqya, it wasn't long before Oqasha was said to be mounting an attack, in coordination with another large Berber army coming in from the west, led by Abd al-Wahid ibn Yazid al-Hawwari. The Berber rebel armies were to make a junction in front of Kairouan, before launching their final attack on the city, Handhala wanted to delay Abd al-Wahid march so he can meet Oqasha large army, Handhala dispatched a cavalry force to slow down Abd al-Wahid's progress, and threw the bulk of his forces to meet Oqasah, they met in a place called Al-Qarn near Kairouan, the fighting was intense and heavy, both sides suffered heavy casualties until Handhala succeeded in crushing the Berber army killing many of them, Oqasha was captured and executed. Handhala withdrew to Kairoun due to fear from Abd al-Wahid to reach there before him

See also
Battle of the Nobles
Battle of Bagdoura
Battle of al-Asnam

References

Nobles
Berber Revolt
742